The bullsnake (Pituophis catenifer sayi) is a large, nonvenomous, colubrid snake. It is a subspecies of the gopher snake (Pituophis catenifer). The bullsnake is one of the largest/longest snakes of North America and the United States, reaching lengths up to 8 ft.

Etymology
The subspecific name, sayi, is in honor of American naturalist Thomas Say.

In Mexico, bullsnakes are called cincuate, (/sentli/; Náhuatl: corn, /coatl/; Náhuatl: snake).

Geographic range
The bullsnake (Pituophis catenifer sayi) occurs throughout the Great Plains and parts of the Midwestern United States, ranging from southern Saskatchewan, and Alberta, Canada south, into Nuevo Leon and Tamaulipas, Mexico. States in the USA include Colorado, Illinois, Indiana, Iowa, Kansas, Minnesota, Missouri, Montana, Nebraska, New Mexico, North Dakota, Oklahoma, South Dakota, Texas, Wisconsin, and Wyoming.

Description

This makes bullsnakes among the largest snakes native to Canada and the United States, although they are generally not as long as indigo snakes nor as heavy or as large in diameter as rattlesnakes. They are usually yellow, with brown, white, black, or sometimes reddish blotching. The blotching pattern is large blotches on top, three sets of spots on the sides, and bands of black on the tail. Many color variations have been found, including albinos and white varieties. A scale count is required to distinguish juvenile bullsnakes from other juvenile gopher snakes.

Diet
Bullsnakes are very powerful constrictors that eat small mammals, such as mice, moles, rats, pocket gophers, ground squirrels, as well as ground-nesting birds, birds' eggs and lizards. Their climbing proficiency enables them to raid bird nests (and birdhouses) to eat the nestlings or sitting mother. One snake can eat five small birds within 15 minutes. Juvenile bullsnakes depend on small lizards, frogs, and baby mice.

The idea that bullsnakes occasionally eat rattlesnakes is sometimes given as a reason for humans not to harm bullsnakes when encountering them in the wild; however, a study of 1000 bullsnakes found only 2 had rattlesnake in their stomach contents, and so this is a very rare occurrence.

Behavior

Though some bullsnakes can be docile, and with some time become accustomed to handling, most are quite defensive.

When bullsnakes detect live objects too big to be prey, they seem to perceive the object as a predator and take defensive action. Their first action is to remain quiet, not moving. Then, when they feel they are able to move away from the object, their next line of defense is to move away as quickly as possible. Bullsnakes, however, are not fast movers and often must take other defensive actions. When threatened by anything as large as a human, a bullsnake's next defensive action is to rear up and make itself look as large as possible, while at the same time hissing at the perceived threat. It typically then begins lunging and retreating at the same time to escape.

Bullsnakes can sometimes be mistaken for rattlesnakes and killed. Owing to its coloration, dorsal pattern, and semikeeled scalation, it superficially resembles the western diamondback rattler (Crotalus atrox), which is also common within the same range. The bullsnake capitalizes on this similarity by performing an impressive rattlesnake impression when threatened. First, it hisses, or forcibly exhales through a glottis or extension of the windpipe. The end of the glottis is covered by a piece of cartilage known as the epiglottis, which flaps back and forth when air is exhaled from the right lung, producing a convincing rattling sound. It also adopts a rattlesnake-like "S-curve" body posture as though about to strike. It commonly vibrates its tail rapidly in brush or leaves, and flattens its head to resemble the characteristic triangular shape of the rattlesnake. These defensive behaviors are meant to scare away threats, however, and not to sound an attack.

In contrast to rattlesnakes, which usually keep their tails elevated to sound the most efficient rattle, bullsnakes tend to keep their tails in contact with the ground, where they can be vibrated against leaves, for example.

Reproduction
Bullsnakes breed in March or April (depending upon their location) and usually lay their eggs in April, May, or June (again, depending upon when the snakes breed.) They typically lay 12 eggs in sand or other protected areas and leave the eggs to incubate unprotected. Clutches of five to 22 eggs have been observed. The eggs typically hatch in August or September. Their color is grayish until after their first shed.

References

Further reading
Schlegel H (1837). Essai sur la physionomie des serpens, Volume II., Partie Descriptive. Amsterdam: M.H. Schonekat. 606 + xv pp. (Coluber sayi, new species, pp. 157–158.) (in French).

External links
Animalspot.net: Bull Snake
IowaHerps.com: Pituophis catenifer sayi (Iowa Bullsnake)

Pituophis
Snakes of North America
Reptiles of Canada
Reptiles of Mexico
Reptiles of the United States
Fauna of Central Mexico
Fauna of Northern Mexico
Fauna of the Great Plains
Fauna of the Plains-Midwest (United States)
Fauna of Western Canada
Taxa named by Hermann Schlegel